Montgomery, New York may refer to several places:
 Montgomery (town), New York in Orange County
 Montgomery (village), New York in Orange County
 Montgomery County, New York

See also
 Fort Montgomery (Hudson River), an American Revolutionary War fort near West Point on the Hudson River
 Fort Montgomery, New York, a hamlet (and census-designated place) in Orange County

Montgomery (disambiguation)